ISO 6344 is an international standard covering the materials sizes and tests regarding sandpaper and other similar coated abrasives. 

It has three parts:
 ISO 6344-1:1998: Grain size distribution test
 ISO 6344-2:1998: Determination of grain size distribution of macrogrits P12 to P220
 ISO 6344-3:1998: Determination of grain size distribution of microgrits P240 to P2500

External links 
 ISO.org

06344